Throw Your Spades Up! is the debut live DVD the Hip-Hop Duo Kingspade that was released on February 19, 2008. The DVD includes the explosive show recorded at the legendary Key Club in West Hollywood on November 3, 2007. The DVD includes the live performance, interviews with the group, and all three Kingspade music videos. "The Deal", "Down 4 Da Krown", "Lifestyles" and "P-Town" are actually songs that were on previous Kottonmouth Kings albums, but being that Daddy X was included only on  "Down 4 Da Krown" and "P-Town" Kingspade performed simply cutting out his verses.

DVD features
Spaded, Jaded and Faded
This Dat Beat
Who's Down
We Ridin
Drunk In Da Club
Who Run This
Neighborhood Trends
The Deal
Lifestyles
Down 4 Da Kro
That's How It Goes
High Ridaz
Same Ol’ Bitches
Life

Bonus Features
Interview with D-Loc
Interview with Johnny Richter
Music video for "Who Run This"
Music video for "Drunk In The Club"
Music video for "Who's Down"
Hidden Interview "D-Loc interviews one of the hash judges from the 2006 Cannabis Cup...sorta
To access the hidden interview go to the main menu and highlight "Play Show". Hit the left button on the directional pad once (the selector should disappear) and hit select.

Personnel
Kingspade: D-Loc and Johnny Richter
Executive Producers: Brad Xavier & Kevin Zinger
Produced by: Devin Dehaven
Production Services by: FortressDVD
DVD Packaging Design and Layout: Casey Quintal
Illustration by: Droopy
DVD Authoring & Bonus Content: Max Stout
Recorded Live and Mixed by: Patrick "P-nice" Shevelin

Live video albums
2008 video albums
Kingspade albums
2008 live albums
Suburban Noize Records live albums
Suburban Noize Records video albums